Maja Lunde (born 1975), is a Norwegian writer.

She made her literary debut in 2012 with the children's novel  ("Across the Border"), a thriller set in 1942, where the protagonists Sarah and Daniel are Jews trying to escape murderous Nazi persecution during the German occupation of Norway, and find their way to neutral Sweden. She was awarded the Norwegian Booksellers' Prize in 2015 for the novel Bienes historie. Bienes historie was published with the title The History of Bees in the United States by Touchstone, a division of Simon and Schuster, in 2017. She graduated from the University of Oslo.

Her children's book Snøsøsteren from 2018 was illustrated by Lisa Aisato. Her next book was Przevalskis hest (2019), named after Przewalski's horse, the third volume in her series on people and climate. (The first volumes in the series were Bienes historie (2015), and Blå (2017)).

References

1975 births
Living people
University of Oslo alumni
Norwegian women novelists
Norwegian women children's writers
Norwegian children's writers
Norwegian screenwriters
21st-century Norwegian novelists
21st-century Norwegian women writers
21st-century screenwriters

Environmental writers
Norwegian women screenwriters